The Columbia University Partnership for International Development (CUPID), is a student-led initiative across Columbia University to facilitate multidisciplinary dialogue, awareness, and action in the field of international development and relief.

History 
In the Fall of 2004, two social work students from the Columbia University School of Social Work began generating interest for a Columbia-wide conference on multidisciplinary perspectives on issues pertaining to international development. This resulted in the 2005 conference titled "Multidisciplinary Perspectives on Armed Conflict and Forced Migration". The conference was coordinated by a multidisciplinary team of student leaders from the Columbia University School of Social Work, Columbia University Law School, and the Mailman School of Public Health.

This collaboration led to the inception of the Columbia University Partnership for International Development. Student representatives across the ten Columbia graduate schools were recruited in order to establish an academic partnership across fields that would continue to inform their work as they became professionals. The underlying hypothesis of this assumption was that the experience would better equip students to develop and implement effective, innovative, and holistic approaches to challenges faced in international development.

Within a year, CUPID organized twelve multidisciplinary forums, co-sponsored six events, facilitated a conference on "Urbanization in the Developing World", sent five students to Central America as part of a multidisciplinary community development team, and coordinated 20 internships with the United Nations Development Programme.

Influential organizations that helped found the Columbia Partnership for International Development included: The Earth Institute, The Africa Institute, The Columbia Alumni Association, The President and Provost's Student Event Fund, and the Open Society Foundations.

Activities

Online Journal 
The CUPID Online Journal is a creative space for students to publish original poetry, photographs, scholarly articles, blog-style posts, opinion pieces and field notes pertaining to international development.

Development Dialogues 
Monthly events hosted by various Columbia graduate schools and colleges on rotation with the purpose of encouraging collective awareness, understanding and action. The Development Dialogues are informal and stimulating conversations regarding contemporary issues. The events usually take place in the form of an expert panel, followed by conversation between panelists and students, practitioners, professors and members of the community.

Annual Conference 
Each Spring, CUPID coordinates a multidisciplinary conference pertaining to important and timely topics in the field of international development. The conference gathers professors, practitioners, students and others and provides a space to discuss important perspectives, lessons learned, best practices, and ways forward.

Upcoming Conference March 2014
"Reframing "Freedom": A Critical Approach to Modern Slavery"

Previous Conference Topics: 
2013: "Millennium Development Goals. Mission Impossible?"
2012: "In a State of Transition. Locating the Role of the International Community."
2011: "Internal Displacement. Unsettled. Uncertain. Unseen."
2010: "Health. A Universal Dialect(ic)? Access to Health in the Developing World"
2009: "Development Without Borders. Is Migration Good for Development?"
2008: "Beyond Polar Bears. Looking Past the Environmental Impacts of Climate Change."
2007: "Philanthropy, Profits and Progress. The Role of Private Actors in International Development."
2006: "Urbanization and the Developing World. Perspectives on the Individual."
2005: "Armed Conflict and Forced Migration. Push and Pull Factors of Resettlement."

Community Initiatives 
Each summer, CUPID collaborates with organizations around the world to provide students with an opportunity to participate in international development partnerships.

Previously, CUPID fellows have worked on projects in: 
China
Dominican Republic
Guatemala
New York City
Nicaragua

Networking and Social Events 
Alumni Networking Event: An opportunity for CUPID members to meet with Columbia alumni currently working in the field of international development.

External links 
Columbia CUPID
Institute for the Study of Human Rights

The President and Provost's Student Event Fund
The Earth Institute
Columbia University School of Social Work
Open Society Foundations

References 

Columbia University student organizations